SWPS University of Social Sciences and Humanities or simply SWPS University is a private non-profit university in Poland established in 1996 by three psychology professors, Andrzej Eliasz, Zbigniew Pietrasiński and Janusz Reykowski.

SWPS University is one of the largest private universities in Poland with a community of over 14,000 students at undergraduate, postgraduate and doctoral levels, including over 1,200 international students from more than 60 countries. The university has five campuses, located in major Polish cities, including Warsaw, Wrocław, Sopot, Poznań, and Katowice.

The institution was formerly known as the Warsaw School of Social Psychology (Szkoła Wyższa Psychologii Społecznej, SWPS). It was granted university status under Polish law in 2015.

Administration 
In 2008, the position of SWPS University founder was transferred to the Institute for the Development of Education (Instytut Rozwoju Edukacji) and its president, Polish businessman and philanthropist Piotr Voelkel. Before 2018, SWPS University was administered by a privately appointed board of trustees. Trustees served four-year terms and met annually. Andrzej Eliasz was chairman of the board of trustees. Other members included Jan Strelau (former chairman of the board of trustees), Michał Jan Boni (Member of the European Parliament), Magdalena Dziewguć (Google for Work), Robert Firmhofer (director of Copernicus Science Centre), Aleksander Kutela (Onet.pl S.A.), Przemysław Schmidt, Ewa Voelkel-Krokowicz. As of 2018, in compliance with the new higher education law in Poland, the governing body of SWPS University consists of rector and director general.

Rectors 
 Andrzej Eliasz (from 1996 to 2016)
 Roman Cieślak (since 2016)

Academics 
SWPS University offers 15 undergraduate and graduate programs taught entirely in English and over 30 undergraduate, graduate, and doctoral study programs, with over 70 specializations, in Polish. The main study areas are Psychology, Law, Languages, Literature and Culture Studies, Media and Communication, Management, and Design. The University has been ranked by the Ministry of Science and Higher Education as the leading higher education institution offering Social Sciences program in Poland.

Faculties 
Seven faculties of SWPS University have the authority to grant doctoral degrees in the following disciplines: cultural studies, literature studies, law, and sociology (in Warsaw) as well as psychology (in Warsaw, Wrocław, and Sopot). The university also has the authority to grant post-doctoral degrees (habilitacja) in cultural studies (Warsaw) and psychology (Warsaw and Wrocław).

 Warsaw Faculty of Psychology
 Warsaw Faculty of Arts and Social Sciences
 Warsaw Faculty of Law
 Sopot Faculty of Psychology
 Katowice Faculty of Psychology
 Wrocław Faculty of Psychology
 Wrocław Faculty of Law and Communication
 Poznań Faculty of Social Sciences and Design

Notable staff 
 Jan Strelau, doctor honoris causa
 Shevah Weiss, doctor honoris causa
 Robert Cialdini, doctor honoris causa
 Philip Zimbardo, doctor honoris causa
 Małgorzata Kossut, head of the Department of Psychophysiology of Cognitive Processes
 Jerzy Adam Kowalski, Institute of Culture Science
 Tomasz Witkowski, founder of the Klub Sceptyków Polskich
 Roman Laskowski, professor of the Jagiellonian University and University of Gothenburg
 Piotr Waglowski, researcher of communication processes in the paradigm of social constructionism
 Andrzej Nowak, director and founder of the Institut of Social Psychology of Internet and Communication
 Jerzy Szacki, one of the most prominent representatives of the Warsaw School of the History of Ideas
 Dariusz Doliński, president of the Psychological Sciences Committee in the Polish Science Academy
 Bogdan Wojciszke
 Klaus Bachmann, associate professor at the Institute of Political Science.

Notable alumni 

 Żanna Słoniowska, novelist and journalist
 Tomasz Kamusella, historian
 Ania, singer
 Aleksandra Szwed, actress
 Katarzyna Cichopek, actress and dancer
 Agnieszka Brustman, chess master

Social engagement 
SWPS University collaborates with various local and national organizations nurturing the idea of social engagement of its faculty and students. SWPS has a Legal Clinic which offers free legal advice for low-income individuals. The University also supports local craftsmen running their small businesses in the Praga District of Warsaw where the University main campus is located. Much of the research output is devoted to social, business and political issues such as neuroscience, behavioral insights for economy and public policy, health and nutrition, ageing, youth adaptation, or facing EU challenges from Horizon Europe (e.g. migrations, human & technology relations in the digital world). SWPS cooperates with various NGOs and institutions devoted to social causes, are the first European campus with the Ashoka Journey to Changemaking Certificate, and are member of newly-established Engaged Universities Forum, grouping 7 Polish Universities around the UN SDGs.

Rankings 

 SWPS University is ranked the second best private higher education institution in Poland according to Perspektywy 2019 Polish University ranking.

 SWPS University is ranked 1001+ in the 2020 World University Rankings by Times Higher Education (THE)  In the 2020 Times Higher Education World University Rankings, SWPS is ranked 401+ in Psychology  and 401-500 in Social Sciences by subject. 
 In ARWU Global Ranking of Academic Subjects 2019 for Psychology SWPS University is ranked 201-300.
 According to the American US News Ranking – 1st Psychology in Poland and 308 in the World.

See also
 Collegium Da Vinci
 SWPS University Press

References

External links 

 
 The SWPS Students Association
 Website of The Warsaw Library

Educational institutions established in 1996
Universities and colleges in Poland
Universities and colleges in Wrocław
Universities and colleges in Katowice
Universities and colleges in Poznań
SWPS University
1996 establishments in Poland